Fayetteville may refer to:

Fayetteville, Alabama
Fayetteville, Arkansas
 The Fayetteville Formation
Fayetteville, Georgia
Fayetteville, Illinois
Fayetteville, Indiana
Fayetteville, Washington County, Indiana
Fayetteville, Missouri
Fayetteville, New York
Fayetteville, North Carolina, the largest US city with this name
Fayetteville, Ohio
Fayetteville, Pennsylvania
Fayetteville, Tennessee
Fayetteville, Texas
Fayetteville, West Virginia
Fayetteville Township, Washington County, Arkansas, conterminous with the city above
Fayetteville Township, St. Clair County, Illinois

See also
 Fayette (disambiguation)
 Lafayette (disambiguation)
 Gilbert du Motier, Marquis de Lafayette, after whom most places are named